Costoanachis sparsa is a species of sea snail, a marine gastropod mollusk in the family Columbellidae, the dove snails.

Description

Distribution
This marine species occurs off French Guiana.

References

Les Columbellidae (Gastropoda: Neogastropoda) de la Guyane française. Xenophora Taxonomy 14: 4-21

External links

Columbellidae
Gastropods described in 1859